Mullurkara railway station (Station Code: MUC) falls between Vallathol Nagar railway station and Wadakkanchery railway station in the busy Shoranur–Cochin Harbour section in Thrissur district. Mullurkara railway station is operated by the Chennai-headquartered Southern Railways of the Indian Railways. All passenger trains stop here.

References

Railway stations in Thrissur district
Thiruvananthapuram railway division